The Empty Glass (c. 1652) is an oil-on-canvas painting by the Dutch painter Pieter de Hooch. It is an example of Dutch Golden Age painting and is now in the collection of the Museum Boijmans Van Beuningen.

This painting was documented as a work by Gabriel Metsu by Hofstede de Groot in 1908, who wrote:204b. A Woman handing a Glass of Wine to an Officer. Sm. 85. A woman hands a glass of wine to an officer. Two persons are playing cards, while a third looks on. Panel, 17 1/2 inches by 14 inches. Described by Descamps (vol. ii.).

Sales. Hendrik Verschuuring, The Hague, September 17, 1770, No. 106. 
C. van Heemskerck, The Hague, November 18, 1783, No. 5 (82 florins) – said to be by Metsu or in his manner."Chez M. Henry Verschuring, une Femme qui presente du vin à un Officier", Page 243 of Jean-Baptiste Descamps's second volume of painter biographies, on "Gabriel Metzu"

This scene is very similar to other paintings De Hooch made in this period:

References

The Empty Glass in the museum website
Herbergscène met een dienstmeid, die het lege glas van een cavalier probeert te vullen, ca. 1650-1655 in the RKD

1650s paintings
Paintings by Pieter de Hooch
Paintings in the collection of the Museum Boijmans Van Beuningen